George Tscherny (born July 12, 1924) is a Hungarian-born American graphic designer and educator. Tscherny has received the highest honors among graphic designers. He was awarded the AIGA Medal in 1988, celebrated in the annual Masters Series in 1992 at the School of Visual Arts, and inducted into the Art Directors Club Hall of Fame in 1997. He has worked in a number of areas ranging from U.S. postage to identity programs for large corporations and institutions.

Working at the height of mid-20th century American modernist design, Tscherny displayed "an ability to seize the essence of the subject and express it in stunningly simple terms" and to reduce "complex content to an elemental graphic symbol expressing the underlying order or basic form of the subject."

At the same time, Tscherny straddled the line between the high European design of the early 20th century and the more popular forms of design communication in the burgeoning post-War American consumer culture. Reflecting on his career in Print magazine in 2014, Tscherny writes, “Unlike the fine artist who values only the original, I as a commercial artist, honor the reproduction as well as its source. I find myself comfortable at the intersection of high and low art”.

Early life and education

George Tscherny was born July 12, 1924 in Budapest, to parents Mendel Tscherny and Bella Heimann. In 1926, the family moved to Berlin, Germany where they lived until he was 14. In December 1938, one month after Kristallnacht, Tscherny and his 12-year-old brother escaped illegally into Holland, where they were granted asylum. Tscherny studied cabinet-making in Holland’s vocational school system while living in various homes for refugee children. Meanwhile, his parents in Berlin having received deportation orders managed to emigrate via Norway to the United States, where they worked to secure United States visas and passage for their sons. Tscherny and his brother, having to return to Berlin in 1941 to secure entrance visas to Portugal, were confronted by the Gestapo for violating the deportation order not having realized that the order had applied to them as well. They were given two weeks to leave Germany, fortunately extended several times.

In June 1941, George and his brother boarded a sealed train which took them from Berlin via France and Spain to Lisbon where they boarded the SS Mouzinho, arriving in New York on June 21, 1941, the very day that Germany attacked Russia. Tscherny settled in Newark, New Jersey where he found a factory job. In June 1944, exactly 3 years after having left, Tscherny landed back in Europe as a soldier in the United States Army, working as a German interpreter in a small prisoner of war compound in Normandy and later with military government in Germany.

Discharged in 1946, Tscherny attended art school on the G.I. Bill, first at the Newark School of Fine and Industrial Art, transferring in the fall of 1947 to Pratt Institute in Brooklyn, New York, where he studied under Herschel Levit and James Brooks. 

In 1947, he met Sonia Katz, and the two were married in 1950. For these past seven decades Sonia has had a profound influence on his private as well professional life. They occupy a New York City townhouse which also incorporates Tscherny’s design studio. They have two daughters.

Tscherny cites as some of his earliest influences the photographer Henri Cartier-Bresson, the American graphic designer Lester Beall, and the type designer Imre Reiner, and later the Bernard Rudofsky and E.H. Gombrich, the jazz composer John Lewis, and the architect and designer George Nelson.

Career 
In 1950, Tscherny began his professional career as a packaging designer with Donald Deskey Associates. In 1953, Tscherny joined George Nelson & Associates, a firm in the vanguard of post-war Modernist design. Tscherny became an associate and head of the graphics department before leaving the Nelson office to open an independent design office in 1956. Tscherny began to teach in the same year. Around the same time, he was hired by the Cartoonist and Illustrators School (soon to become the School of Visual Arts) to establish a graphic design department and change the direction of the curriculum. He also designed a series of posters to appear in the subway that would reflect the new image and expanded goals of the school and later designed the school's current logo.

The Tscherny design office quickly acquired a distinguished roster of institutional and corporate clients. Tscherny was appointed design consultant to the Ford Foundation. In 1955, he designed the first appointment calendar for the Museum of Modern Art. The Tscherny office designed comprehensive identification programs for United Aircraft, Texasgulf, and W.R. Grace, as well as corporate annual reports for RCA, American Can, Burlington Industries, Colgate Palmolive, General Dynamics, Johnson & Johnson, CPC International, Morgan Stanley, SEI Investments, Uris Buildings, Colonial Penn Group, Mickelberry Corp., and Overseas National Airways.

A wide range of other assignments has included the design of a U.S. postage stamp commemorating Alexander Graham Bell and the centennial of the telephone, cigarette packaging for Liggett & Myers Tobacco Co., and illustrations for the Saturday Evening Post. Past clients include: Champion Papers, Monadnock Paper, Strathmore, Simpson Paper, Air Canada, PanAm, Mobil, IBM, Bankers Trust, Goethe House, J.C. Penney, Bergamo Fabrics, American Federation of Arts, Interactive Language Teaching, Owens-Corning Fiberglas, Millipore, and numerous others.

Tscherny’s posters are represented in the collection of the Museum of Modern Art, N.Y.; the Cooper Hewitt Smithsonian Design Museum, N.Y.; the Library of Congress, Washington, DC; and the Kunstgewerbemuseum, Zürich. A comprehensive collection of Tscherny’s work is included in the Graphic Design Archives at Rochester Institute of Technology and in the Milton Glaser Design Study Center and Archives at the School of Visual Arts. Over 100 posters and other examples of work are included in the AGI archives of the Bibliothèque Nationale de France.

Tscherny served two terms (1966–1968) as president of the American Institute of Graphic Arts (AIGA) and is a member of Alliance Graphique Internationale (AGI). In 1988, the American Institute of Graphic Arts (AIGA) awarded George Tscherny their annual medal “In recognition of distinguished achievements and contributions to the graphic arts.” In 1997 Tscherny was inducted into the N.Y. Art Directors Hall of Fame.

The book “AIGA Self Portraits 2015” featured self-portraits by established designers with their advice to young designers. Tscherny contributed a self-portrait with the comment: “Respect for the past, enthusiasm for the present, and Hope for the future.”

References

External links 
 George Tscherny Collection at the Milton Glaser Design Study Center and Archives, School of Visual Arts
 George Tscherny Collection at the Graphic Design Archive, Rochester Institute of Technology
 SVA Subway Series Hall of Fame: George Tscherny
 Interview at Designculture
 George Tscherny, Designer of SVA's Logo and First Subway Poster, Looks Back video
 Biography of Tscherny online at the Art Directors Club
 Biography of Tscherny online at AIGA
 Article and interview at Eye magazine

Further reading 
 Longyear, William. Advertising Layout. The Ronald Press, New York. 1954.
 Who’s Who in Graphic Art, 1st edition. Amstutz & Herdeg Graphis Press, Zurich. 1962.
 W.R. Grace & Co. Speaking Out on Annual Reports: Commentaries on the Organization and Creation of Annual Reports, 2nd Edition. S.D.Scott Printing Co. Inc., New York. 1963.
 Kamekura, Yusaku. Trademarks and Symbols of the World. Reinhold Publishing Corporation, New York. 1965.
 Graphic Designers in the U.S.A., Vol. 3. Bijutsu Shuppan-Sha, Tokyo. 1972. Includes a 29-page retrospective.
 Fox, Martin and&Carol Stevens Kner. Print Casebooks 2: The Best in Annual Reports, 2nd Annual Edition. RC Publications, Inc., Washington, D.C. 1977. 
 Thompson, Philip & Peter Davenport. The Dictionary of Visual Language. Boyle Books Ltd., London. 1980.
 Kince, Eli. Visual Puns in Design: The Pun Used as a Communications Tool. Watson-Guptill, New York. 1982.
 Who’s Who in Graphic Art, Volume 2. Walter Amstutz (editor). De Clivo Press, Dübendorf, Switzerland. 1982.
 Igarashi, Takenobu. World Trademarks and Logotypes. Graphic-sha Publishing Company, Tokyo. 1983.
 Morgan, A. L. Contemporary Designers. Macmillan, London. 1984.
 For the Love of Letters. Pastore DePamphilis Rampone, New York. 1984.
 Craig, James & Bruce Barton. Thirty Centuries of Graphic Design, Watson-Guptill, New York. 1987.
 Igarashi, Takenobu. World Trademarks and Logotypes: A Collection of International Symbols and Their Applications, Vol. 2. Graphic-sha Publishing Company, Tokyo. 1987.
 Horn, Maurice. Contemporary Graphic Artists, Vol 3, Gale Research Co., Detroit. 1988.
 Cato, K. First Choice: Leading International Designers Select the Very Best of Their Own Work. Graphic-sha, Tokyo. 1989.
 Henrion, F.H.K. AGI Annals. Graphic-sha, Tokyo. 1989.
 Gottshall, Edward M. Typographic Communications Today. The MIT Press. 1989.
 Heller, Steven. (1989). “The Disarmingly Simple Design of George Tscherny,” Graphic Design USA. 10.
 Elam, Kimberly. Expressive Typography: The Word as Image. Van Nostrand Reinhold, New York. 1990.
 Sato, Koichi, ed. Catalogue and Pamphlet. Graphic-sha Publishing Company, Tokyo. 1991.
 Naylor, Colin, ed. Contemporary Masterworks. St. James Press, Chicago. 1991.
 Holland, D.K.; Michael Bierut & William Drenttel. Graphic Design: New York: The Work of Thirty-Nine Great Design Firms from the City That Put Graphic Design on the Map. Rockport Publishers, Beverly, MA. 1992.
 Who’s Who in Graphic Design. Benteli-Werd Verlag, Zurich, Switzerland. 1994.
 Pile, John. The Dictionary of 20th Century Design. Da Capo Press, Cambridge, MA. 1994
 The 100 Best Posters from Europe and the United States 1945-1990. Toppan Printing Co., Ltd., Tokyo. 1995.
 Transition of Modern Typography: Europe & America, 1950s-'60s. Ginza Graphic Gallery, Tokyo. 1996.
 Martin, Diana & Lynn Haller. Street Smart Design. North Light Books. 1996.
 Gold: Fifty Years of Creative Graphic Design. Pbc International. 1997.
 The 76th Art Directors Annual. The Art Directors Club, NY. 1997. Tscherny's Hall of Fame induction.
 Friedl, Friedrich; Nicolaus Ott & Bernard Stein, eds. Typography: When Who How. Köneman, Germany. 1998.
 Fishel, Catherine & Gail Deibler Finke. Minimal Graphics: The Powerful New Look of Graphic Design. Rockport Publishers. 1999.
 Anderson, Denise; Rose Gonnella & Robin Landa. Creative Jolt. North Light Books. 2000.
 Cullen, Cheryl Dangel. Identity Design That Works: Secrets for Successful Identity Design. Rockport Publishers. 2003.
 Lipton, Ronnie. The Practical Guide to Information Design. Wiley. 2007.
 Bos, Ben & Elly Bos. AGI: Graphic Design Since 1950. Thames & Hudson, New York. 2007
 Heller, Steven. Icons of Graphic Design. Thames & Hudson, New York. 2008.          
 George Nelson: Architect, Writer, Designer, Teacher. Vitra Design Stiftung, Weil am Rhein, Germany. 2008.
 Grafiks, Bildi. Tempest Fugit: World’s Best Calendar Design. Index Book, Barcelona, Spain. 2009.
 Milani, Armado. No Word Poster. RIT Press, Rochester, NY. 2015.

Hungarian graphic designers
American graphic designers
AIGA medalists
1924 births
Living people
Artists from Budapest
Pratt Institute alumni
Hungarian emigrants to the United States